Bartolomé José Hidalgo (Montevideo, 24 August 1788 - Morón, 28 November 1822) was a Uruguayan writer and poet.

Alongside Hilario Ascasubi he is considered one of the initiators of Gaucho literature.

Nowadays the most important literary award in Uruguay is named after him: Premio Bartolomé Hidalgo.

Also the National Route 13 and a park near Andresito are named after him.

See also
Gaucho literature
Uruguayan literature

References

External links

1788 births
1822 deaths
Writers from Montevideo
19th-century Uruguayan poets
Uruguayan male poets
19th-century male writers